Arthur Milton (September 3, 1905 – death date unknown) was an American Negro league first baseman in the 1940s.

A native of Jacksonville, Florida, Milton played for the Baltimore Elite Giants and New York Black Yankees in 1943. In his three recorded games, he posted one hit in 11 plate appearances.

References

External links
 and Seamheads

1905 births
Year of death missing
Place of death missing
Baltimore Elite Giants players
New York Black Yankees players
Baseball first basemen
Baseball players from Jacksonville, Florida